The men's hammer throw at the 2018 European Athletics Championships took place at the Olympic Stadium on 6 and 7 August.

Records

Schedule

Results

Qualification
Qualification: 76.00 m (Q) or best 12 performers (q)

Final

References

Hammer Throw
Hammer throw at the European Athletics Championships